= Science Platform Aircraft =

Research aircraft used in earth science

Science Platform Aircraft are aircraft that benefit the earth science community. These aircraft are unique to NASA or are commercial aircraft. They are equipped with sensors that provide data for NASA's spaceborne missions. This program is part of the Earth Science Division and is what provides new aircraft systems that will further science and make better the use of data from satellites. There are four main goals to the program and those are satellite calibration and validation, support new sensor development, process studies, and develop the next-generation of scientists and engineers.

== Satellite Calibration and Validation ==
Calibration is defined as the process of quantitatively defining the system response to known, controlled signal inputs. Validation is defined as the process of assessing by independent means the quality of the data provided. Higher level products can be successfully generated from satellite sensor data only if both calibration and validation are present. This allows Earth observation satellites the ability to get calibration measurements and allows them to get validation of their data retrieval algorithms.

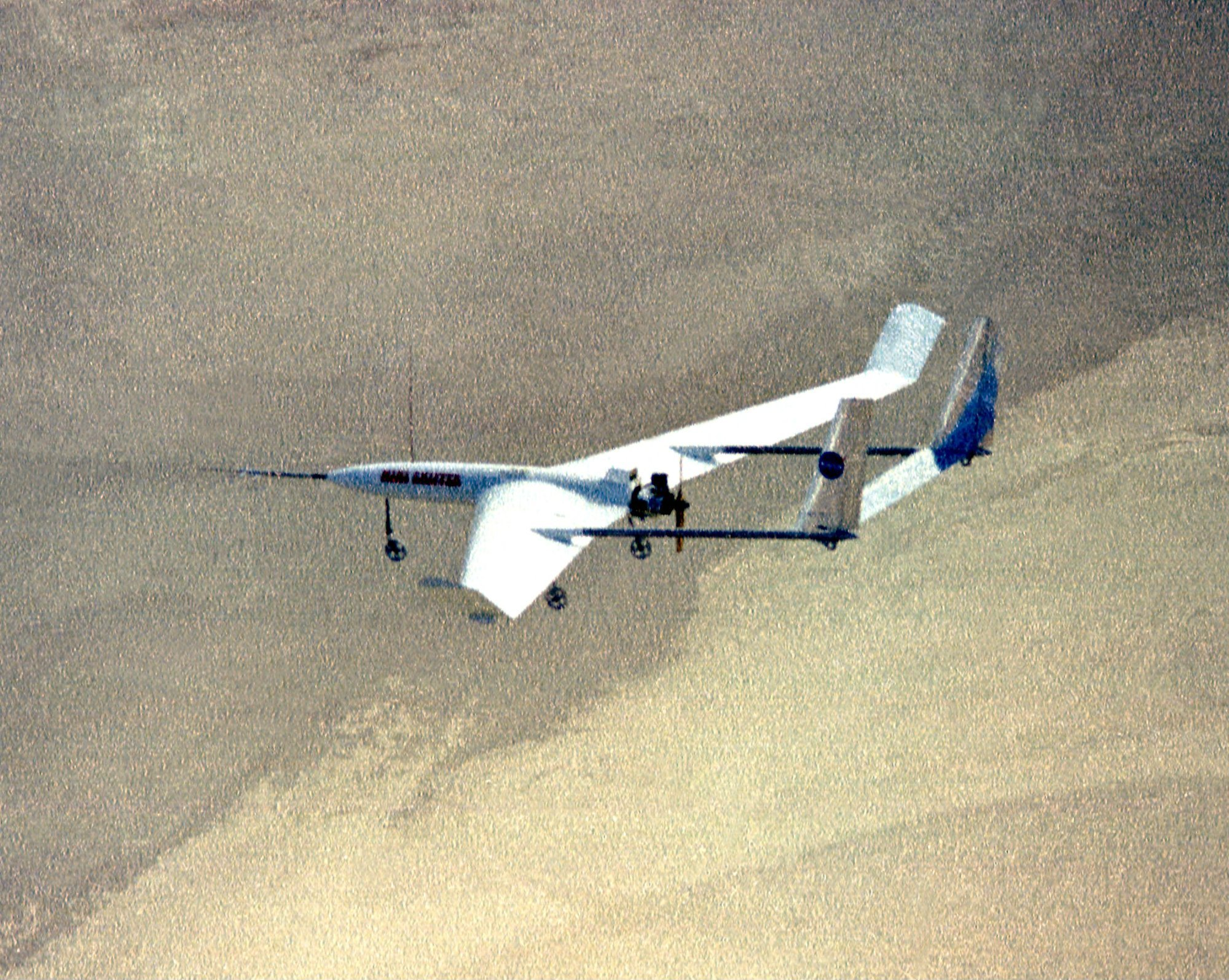

== New Sensor Development ==
When using sensors to gain data, science platform aircraft use remote sensors. These can be broken into two groups; active and passive.

=== Active Sensors ===
Active sensors emit radiation in the direction of the object they are observing causing it to light up. To get a reading, it measures how much energy is reflected back at the sensor. Most active sensors are in the microwave part of the electromagnetic spectrum. This means that they are able to pass through almost any atmospheric condition.

=== Passive Sensors ===
Passive sensors work by detecting natural radiation from the object that is being observed. The most common source of radiation comes from reflected sunlight. Most passive sensors operate in the visible, infrared, and microwave sections of the electromagnetic spectrum.

== Process Studies ==
Combining global satellite observations with high resolution spatial measurements allows for a better understanding of the complete Earth system.

== Bibliography ==
- Berrick, Stephen. "Remote Sensors." NASA, NASA, 17 Oct. 2016, earthdata.nasa.gov/user-resources/remote-sensors.
- Justice, Erin. "NASA Airborne Science Program." NASA, NASA, 16 Aug. 2012, https://airbornescience.nasa.gov/aircraft
- Fladeland, Matthew. "NASA Airborne Science Program." NASA, NASA, 17 Dec. 2013, airbornescience.nasa.gov/.
- "VI. Calibration and Validation of Space-Based Observations." VI. Calibration and Validation of Space-Based Observations, www.fao.org/docrep/005/ac654e/ac654e08.htm.wor
